Jahrah may refer to:

 Al Jahra -town in Kuwait
Jahrah, Yemen - village in Yemen